Zero 7 are an English musical duo consisting of Henry Binns and Sam Hardaker. They began as studio engineers and in 1997 formed the group Zero 7. Their debut album, Simple Things, was released in 2001 in which their song "Destiny" stayed in the top 100 of the UK Single Charts. Subsequent albums include When It Falls, The Garden, and Yeah Ghost.

After studying sound engineering, Binns and Hardaker began their careers in the music industry in the 1990s at Mickie Most's RAK recording studio in London, engineering music for British groups like Pet Shop Boys, Young Disciples, and Robert Plant. In 1997 they created a remix of the song "Climbing Up the Walls" by Radiohead (which was also the first time the name 'Zero 7' was used) and Binns received a credit for additional sampling on Kid A. The pair also remixed Terry Callier's "Love Theme From Spartacus" and songs by Lenny Kravitz, Sneaker Pimps and Lambchop.

History
The name Zero 7 was chosen after Binns and Hardaker spent time on the Honduran island Utila, which contained a bar named Cero Siete. After returning to the UK they were asked by Radiohead to remix the song "Climbing Up the Walls". Binns and Hardaker called their mix "the Zero 7 Mix", and the name stuck.

In 1999, they released an EP of original material called EP 1, under the name Zero 7. In 2001, they released their debut album, Simple Things, which featured collaborations with vocalists Mozez, Sia, and Sophie Barker. The album became a gold record, was nominated for the Mercury Music Prize, and won the "Best Newcomer" Muzik Award. Live appearances after the album's release consisted of Binns and Hardaker along with guest vocalists and other musicians, with as many as 20 performers on stage at once.

In 2004, they released their second album, When It Falls. In addition to the three vocalists from their first album, it featured a collaboration with Danish singer-songwriter Tina Dico. That same year, Binns co-wrote the Emma Bunton track "Breathing".

Zero 7 released their third album, The Garden, in May 2006, which contained vocals performed by Binns as well as guest vocalists Sia and Swedish folk musician José González. The album was named after the collage that artist friend Gideon London produced for its cover.

In 2007, Binns and Hardaker created a band called Ingrid Eto, which has been described as a Zero 7 instrumental project. In 2009, they released an experimental instrumental EP under the name Kling, titled Kling EP. Its tracks were later incorporated into Zero 7's fourth album, Yeah Ghost, also released in 2009. The album included contributions from jazz and soul singer Eska Mtungwazi as well as folk artist Martha Tilston.

In 2010, the duo released a retrospective compilation titled Record. A two-disc special edition contained exclusive remixes of songs from all four of their prior studio albums. In 2013, the band released a 12" single, "On My Own" b/w "Don't Call It Love", on their own label, Make Records.

In 2014, the band released the Simple Science EP, followed by EP3 in 2015. Both were released on Make Records.

In 2016, Henry Binns teamed up with Bo Bruce and Jodi Miliner to form a group called Equador.

At the end of 2018, Zero 7 released the track "Mono" featuring Hidden. This was followed at the beginning of 2019 by "Aurora", which marked the band's first collaboration with González in over a decade.

October 2019 further saw the duo release the new single "Swimmers", with additional vocals courtesy of UK based singer Jem Cooke.

In August 2020, the band released a single, "Shadows", and announced an upcoming EP. In October 2020, the Shadows EP was released, containing 4 tracks by singer-songwriter Lou Stone.

Discography

 Simple Things (2001)
 When It Falls (2004)
 The Garden (2006)
 Yeah Ghost (2009)

Awards
 Nominated for the Mercury Prize 2001 for Simple Things.
 Nominated for Best British Newcomer at the Brit Awards 2002.
 Nominated for a 2007 Grammy Award for The Garden, in the category 'Best Electronic/Dance Album'.

See also
List of downtempo artists
List of trip hop artists

References

External links
 
 
 Zero 7 on Facebook

English electronic music duos
Musical groups from London
Remixers
Trip hop groups
Ableton Live users
Atlantic Records artists
Elektra Records artists
Musical groups established in 1997
Palm Pictures artists
Chill-out musicians
Downtempo musicians
Acid jazz musicians
Male musical duos